Lakefront liberals is a voting bloc in the city of Chicago that was prominent in the 1970s and 1980s.

Description
Lakefront liberals are described as geographically residing along the lakefront of Chicago in neighborhoods such as Lake View and Lincoln Park. Some included the South Side lakefront neighborhood Hyde Park as another area of Chicago where they occupied.

They are predominantly white professionals. Many of the members of the coalition were born during the baby boom.

Their beliefs included "good government" and racial equality.

Electoral impact
Lakefront liberals were credited with the two-term election of 44th Ward alderman Dick Simpson in the 1970s. Another alderman considered a lakefront liberal was William Singer. Yet another alderman considered one was David Orr, who later became a long-serving Cook County Clerk.

Lakefront liberals were credited with contributing to the elections of Harold Washington in 1983 and 1987. During the 1987 Democratic mayoral primary, both Washington and his challenger, former mayor Jane Byrne, actively pursued the lakefront liberal vote.

Modern status
Some analysts believed that lakefront liberals supported Rahm Emanuel in his 2011 election.

Some writers believed that Lori Lightfoot was the beneficiary of lakefront liberals' support in the 2019 Chicago mayoral election. In the initial round the election, Bill Ruthhart of the Chicago Tribune wrote that her, "base proved to be in the liberal lakefront wards on the North Side." In the initial round, Lightfoot saw particularly strong performances in far north lakefront neighborhoods. Lightfoot also carried the endorsement of former lakefront liberals-supported alderman Dick Simpson.

Possible extinction
Lakefront liberals are considered by some political writers to be largely extinct. Edward McClell wrote this in a late-2019 Chicago magazine article. McClell argued that lakefront neighborhoods on the North Side of Chicago have become among of the wealthiest neighborhoods in Chicago, and have also become some of the most conservative-leaning neighborhoods. North side lakefront communities were among the most supportive areas for Mayor Rahm Emanuel (who was regarded as an "establishment" politician) in his elections. McClell wrote that it is theorized that much of the former lakefront liberals voting base left the geographic area that the coalition once occupied, after being priced-out, moving to neighborhoods such as Wicker Park, Logan Square, and  Avondale, making up part of what is now known as the "Milwaukee Avenue Progressives".

References

Government of Chicago
Politics of Illinois
Liberalism in the United States